Fantastic Beasts and Where to Find Them is a 2016 fantasy film directed by David Yates and written by J. K. Rowling.  It is the first instalment in the Fantastic Beasts film series and the ninth overall in the Wizarding World franchise, serving as a spin-off of and prequel to the Harry Potter film series; it is inspired by the 2001 guide book of the same name by Rowling. The film features an ensemble cast that includes Eddie Redmayne, Katherine Waterston, Dan Fogler, Alison Sudol, Ezra Miller, Samantha Morton, Jon Voight, Carmen Ejogo, Ron Perlman, and Colin Farrell.

Fantastic Beasts and Where to Find Them premiered in New York City on 10 November 2016 and opened in theatres worldwide on 18 November 2016 in 2D, 3D, 4D, Dolby Cinema, and IMAX formats, by Warner Bros. Pictures. It received generally positive reviews from critics and emerged a commercial success after grossing $814 million worldwide, making it the eighth highest-grossing film of 2016. The film was nominated for five British Academy Film Awards, including Best British Film, and won for Best Production Design. It was nominated for two Academy Awards and won for Best Costume Design, becoming the first Wizarding World film to win an Academy Award.

A sequel, The Crimes of Grindelwald, was released in November  2018, and a third film, The Secrets of Dumbledore, was released in April 2022.

Plot

In 1926, British wizard and "magizoologist" Newton "Newt" Scamander arrives in New York City. He observes Mary Lou Barebone, the non-magical ("No-Maj" or "Muggle") head of the New Salem Philanthropic Society, preaching that witches and wizards are real and dangerous. Attempting to recapture a Niffler that escaped from his suitcase of magical creatures, Newt meets No-Maj Jacob Kowalski, an aspiring baker, and they unwittingly swap suitcases. Porpentina "Tina" Goldstein, a demoted Auror of the Magical Congress of the United States (MACUSA), arrests Newt for breaking magical law. Since the suitcase in his possession only contains Jacob's baked goods, Newt is released. At home, Jacob opens Newt's suitcase, inadvertently freeing several creatures into the city.

After Tina and Newt find Jacob and the suitcase, Tina takes them to her apartment and introduces them to Queenie, her Legilimens sister. Jacob and Queenie are mutually attracted, though American wizards are forbidden to have any contact with No-Majs. Newt takes Jacob inside his suitcase, magically expanded to house various creatures including an Obscurial, a parasite that develops inside magically gifted children when their abilities are suppressed; those afflicted rarely live past the age of ten.

After they recapture two of the three escaped beasts, Tina returns the suitcase to MACUSA, but they are arrested, as officials believe one of Newt's creatures is responsible for killing Senator Henry Shaw Jr., who was actually attacked by a different Obscurial. The Director of Magical Security, Percival Graves, accuses Newt of conspiring with the infamous dark wizard Gellert Grindelwald, and decides to destroy Newt's suitcase and obliviate Jacob's recent memories. Newt and Tina are sentenced to death. Queenie senses this, rescues Jacob before his memory can be wiped, then helps Newt and Tina escape and retrieve Newt's suitcase. A tip from Tina's goblin informant Gnarlak leads the four to recapture the last of the escaped creatures.

Graves approaches Credence, Mary Lou's adult adopted son, and offers to free him from his abusive mother in exchange for helping to find the Obscurial causing destruction throughout the city. Credence finds a wand under his adopted sister Modesty's bed, which Mary Lou assumes is his; when Credence is about to be punished, the Obscurial kills Mary Lou and her eldest daughter Chastity. Graves, assuming Modesty is the Obscurus' host, dismisses Credence as a Squib and refuses to teach him magic as he had promised in return for service. Credence reveals he is the real host, having survived due to the intensity of his magic, and attacks the city in broad daylight.

Newt finds Credence hiding in a subway tunnel, but is attacked by Graves. Tina, who had tried to protect Credence from Mary Lou (leading to her demotion), attempts to calm the boy, while Graves tries to convince Credence to listen to him. As Credence returns to human form, MACUSA President Seraphina Picquery and the Aurors counterattack, shattering the Obscurial. However, unseen by anyone but Newt, a single wisp of the creature flees the scene. Graves admits he had planned to unleash the Obscurial to expose the magical community to the No-Majs and then frame Newt for the incident. He claims MACUSA's laws openly protect No-Majs at the expense of the magical community, and he no longer cares to live in hiding. Picquery orders the Aurors to apprehend Graves, but he defeats them. Newt captures him with the help of one of his beasts and reveals that Graves is Grindelwald in disguise.

MACUSA fears their secret world has been exposed, but Newt releases his Thunderbird to disperse a potion that obliviates recent memories over the city as rainfall, while MACUSA wizards repair the destruction and erase all evidence of their existence. Queenie kisses Jacob goodbye as the rain erases his memories, and Newt returns to England. Jacob opens a bakery with pastries resembling Newt's beasts, and, when Queenie enters, he smiles at her.

Cast 

 Eddie Redmayne as Newt Scamander, an introverted British wizard, magizoologist and an employee of the Ministry of Magic. Scamander is the future author of the Hogwarts School of Witchcraft and Wizardry standard textbook Fantastic Beasts and Where to Find Them. Redmayne was cast in June 2015. Matt Smith and Nicholas Hoult were also considered for the role.
 Katherine Waterston as Tina Goldstein a grounded, down-to-earth witch and former Auror employed by MACUSA. She longs to fight for what is right, but was demoted to a position well below her skill level.
 Dan Fogler as Jacob Kowalski, a genial No-Maj cannery worker and aspiring baker who is exposed to the New York City magical community after he and Newt accidentally switch suitcases.
 Alison Sudol as Queenie Goldstein, Tina's younger sister and roommate. Described as a free-spirited, big-hearted bombshell, she is a naturally born and skilled Legilimens.
 Samantha Morton as Mary Lou Barebone, a narrow-minded No-Maj and the sinister leader of the New Salem Philanthropic Society or "The Second-Salemers", a group whose goals include exposing and killing wizards and witches.
 Ezra Miller as Credence Barebone, a secret Obscurial wizard and Mary Lou's troubled adopted son.
 Jon Voight as Henry Shaw Sr., a newspaper owner and the father of U.S. Senator Henry Shaw Jr. and Langdon Shaw.
 Carmen Ejogo as Seraphina Picquery, the President of MACUSA, the Magical Congress of the United States of America. As such, she is the American equivalent of a Minister for Magic in the United Kingdom.
 Colin Farrell as Percival Graves, a high-ranking Auror and Director of Magical Security for MACUSA, responsible for the protection of wizards. Since Grindelwald spends most of the first film disguised as Percival Graves, Colin Farrell portrays him in those scenes.
 Ron Perlman as the voice of Gnarlak, a goblin gangster who owns a magical speakeasy nightclub called "The Blind Pig".
 Faith Wood-Blagrove as Modesty Barebone, a haunted young girl who is the youngest of Mary Lou's adopted children. Wood-Blagrove was chosen from among thousands of children who auditioned in an open casting call.
 Ronan Raftery as Langdon Shaw, the youngest of Henry Shaw Sr.'s sons, who begins to believe in magic.
 Josh Cowdery as Henry Shaw Jr., the eldest of Henry Shaw Sr.'s sons; an arrogant and cruel U.S. Senator.
 Kevin Guthrie as Abernathy, Tina and Queenie's MACUSA supervisor.
 Jenn Murray as Chastity Barebone, the middle of Mary Lou's adopted children.
 Gemma Chan as Madam Ya Zhou, a witch who is a member of MACUSA.
 Johnny Depp as Gellert Grindelwald, an infamous, powerful dark wizard who believes in the superiority of wizards and seeks to lead a new Wizarding Order.

Zoë Kravitz appears in a photograph as Leta Lestrange, Newt's former love who betrayed his trust, to set up her role in the sequel film Fantastic Beasts: The Crimes of Grindelwald (2018).

Production

Development 
Fantastic Beasts and Where to Find Them is mentioned several times as a school textbook in the Harry Potter book series, with Scamander named as the author. In 2001, Rowling published an edition of the "textbook" to be sold to raise money for the British charity Comic Relief. The book is a directory of magical creatures with an introduction by its author, Newt Scamander. It does not contain a narrative.

First announced in September 2013 just two years after the release of Harry Potter and the Deathly Hallows – Part 2, the Fantastic Beasts project marked Rowling's debut as a screenwriter. The film sees the return of producer David Heyman, as well as writer Steve Kloves, both veterans of the Potter film franchise. There were rumors that Alfonso Cuarón would direct, which he refuted in May 2014. Warner Bros. announced that David Yates would direct at least the first instalment of a planned trilogy. James Newton Howard was brought on board to score the film.

Filming 
Principal photography began on 17 August 2015, at Warner Bros. Studios, Leavesden, in Hertfordshire, England and wrapped in January 2016. Several scenes were shot on location in London. After two months, the production moved to the Cunard Building and St George's Hall in Liverpool, which was transformed into 1920s New York City. Framestore in London produced the visual effects for the film.

Music 

On 9 April 2016, the film's website announced that James Newton Howard would write and compose the score. On 24 October 2016, Pottermore published an official first look at the film's main theme composed by Howard. The main theme incorporated John Williams' themes from earlier films, such as "Hedwig's Theme". The soundtrack was released by WaterTower Music on 18 November 2016, coinciding with the film's release worldwide.

Visual effects 
The visual effects were provided by Cinesite, DNEG, Framestore, Image Engine, Moving Picture Company, Milk VFX and Rodeo FX.

Marketing 
On 4 November 2015, Entertainment Weekly released the first official publicity shots of the film, including pictures of characters Newt, Tina, and Queenie, and behind-the-scenes shots of production and filming on various sets designed to mirror 1920s New York City. On 10 December 2015, @Fantastic Beasts announced on Twitter that an "announcement trailer" would be released on 15 December. A teaser poster was also released along with the one-minute trailer.

During "A Celebration of Harry Potter" at Universal Orlando Resort in February 2016, a featurette was released showcasing several interviews with various cast and crew members, as well as the first official behind-the-scenes footage. On 10 April 2016, the first "teaser trailer" was released during the MTV Movie Awards. On 10 August 2016, more information and publicity shots for the film were released through Entertainment Weekly, with new information on Ezra Miller's character, Credence Barebone, and the news that Zoë Kravitz would have a role in the series. New images released at the time include the quartet running down a New York City alleyway; David Yates chatting to stars Katherine Waterston and Eddie Redmayne on the set in front of a blown out subway station; Colin Farrell's character, Percival Graves, interrogating an arrested and handcuffed Newt; and Graves and Credence putting up anti-magic propaganda. A final trailer for the film was released on 28 September 2016.

Tie-in literature and merchandise
The film's script was published in book form on 18 November 2016. Fantastic Beasts and Where to Find Them: The Original Screenplay was written by Rowling herself.

On 7 March 2016 a trailer-preview was released about the History of Magic in North America as it is in the Harry Potter universe. On 7 October 2016, Rowling also released on Pottermore four pieces of writing exclusively as an introduction to the film Fantastic Beasts and Where to Find Them, titled History of Magic in North America. It includes information about scourers in North America, brutal and violent magical mercenaries who played a significant role in the historic Salem witch trials of the 1600s; info about various American wand makers; the role magic played in World War I; the foundation of MACUSA; the harsh enforcement No-Maj/Wizarding segregation; and life in 1920s Wizarding America; with info about wand permits and prohibition; and her fictionalized ideas of "Native American Magic." Her use of Native American religious figures and symbolism from contemporary, living cultures for this work of fiction was met with protests by Native American communities; she was accused of racial insensitivity, violation of intellectual property rights, disrespect and appropriating "Native traditions while erasing Native peoples."

On 28 June 2016, Rowling released a second part to her History of Magic in North America series, concerning the fictitious Ilvermorny School of Witchcraft and Wizardry, detailing the founding of the pre-eminent American Wizarding academy and allowing users to sort themselves into one of the four houses of the school. The school itself is mentioned in the film.

A "story pack" based on Fantastic Beasts and Where to Find Them was released for the video game Lego Dimensions by WB Games and TT Games. The pack includes a constructible model of MACUSA, figures of Newt Scamander and a Niffler, and a six-level game campaign that adapts the film's events. The pack was released on the same day as the film, alongside a "fun pack" containing figures of Tina Goldstein and a Swooping Evil. The cast of the film reprises their roles in the game.

Release

Theatrical 
Fantastic Beasts and Where to Find Them had its world premiere at Alice Tully Hall in New York City on 10 November 2016. The film was released worldwide on 18 November 2016, in 2D, 3D and the new IMAX 3D 4K Laser system. It would premiere one day earlier in a number of other countries, including Argentina, Australia, Brazil, Germany and Italy, on 17 November. The film would be released to a total of 1,028 IMAX 3D screens worldwide (388 screens in the United States and Canada, 347 screens in China, 26 screens in Japan and 267 screens in other countries). This marked the second time—after Doctor Strange—that a film secured a release in more than 1,000 IMAX 3D screens worldwide.

Home media
Fantastic Beasts was released on Digital HD on 7 March 2017, and on 4K UHD, 3D Blu-ray, Blu-ray and DVD on 28 March 2017.

Reception

Box office 
Fantastic Beasts and Where to Find Them grossed $234 million in the United States and Canada and $580 million in other countries for a total of $814 million. The film was made on a budget of $175 million, with an additional $150 million spent on marketing. Worldwide, the film grossed $219.9 million during its opening weekend in around 64 markets on 24,200 screens, both the fifth-biggest in Rowling's wizarding cinematic universe, and the seventh-biggest for the month of November 2016. IMAX totalled $15 million from 605 screens. Deadline Hollywood calculated the net profit of the film to be $164 million, when factoring together all expenses and revenues for the film, making it the ninth-most profitable release of 2016.

United Kingdom and Ireland
Fantastic Beasts went on general release in the United Kingdom and Ireland on 18 November 2016. It debuted with £15.33 million ($19.15 million) from 666 cinemas, the biggest debut of any film in 2016, ahead of the previous record holder, Batman v Superman: Dawn of Justice (£14.62 million). The film vied with Bridget Jones' Baby and briefly won first place, only to be surpassed during the last days of 2016 by Rogue One: A Star Wars Story.

United States and Canada
In the United States and Canada, estimates predicted that the film would gross $68–85 million—or more—in its opening weekend. The film was released on 18 November in 4,143 cinemas, of which 388 were IMAX screens, and more than 3,600 were showing the film in 3D. It grossed $29.7 million on its first day, the second-lowest opening day among Rowling's adaptations (behind the $29.6 million Friday of Harry Potter and the Chamber of Secrets). This included $8.75 million it earned from Thursday-night preview screenings beginning at 6 p.m. in 3,700 cinemas. In total, the film earned $74.4 million in its opening weekend, falling in line with projections and finishing first at the box office, but it recorded the lowest opening among films in Rowling's Harry Potter universe. It made $8 million from 388 IMAX screens, $9 million from 500 premium large-format locations and $1.75 million from Cinemark XD.

The film's opening was considered a hit, taking into account the fact that the story was not based on an existing, popular source, and the film itself was missing the franchise's main character, Harry Potter. It was the top choice among moviegoers, representing 47% of the weekend's total $157.6 million tickets sales. On its second Friday, it had a gradual drop of 37% ($18.5 million) from the week before, the second-best Friday drop for any Harry Potter film, behind The Philosopher's Stone. This was in part due to Black Friday, the most lucrative day of the Thanksgiving Day stretch. It ended up grossing $45.1 million in its second weekend (a drop of just 39.4%), finishing 2nd at the box office behind newcomer Moana.

Other markets
Outside North America, the film debuted day-and-date in 63 countries, along with its North American release, where it was projected to gross $90–125 million in its opening weekend. It opened 16 November 2016 in 9 countries, earning $6.9 million from 5,070 screens. It opened in 38 more countries on 18 November, earning $16.6 million for a total of $23.5 million in two days. In three days, it made $53.6 million. Through Sunday, 20 November, the film had a five-day opening weekend of $145.5 million from 63 countries, above the initial projections. It earned another $132 million in its second weekend after a large debut in China and Japan.

It recorded the biggest opening day of all time among the Harry Potter franchise in South Korea ($1.7 million), the Philippines ($1.2 million), the UAE ($429,000) and Ukraine, the second biggest in Mexico ($1.8 million), Russia and the CIS ($1.7 million), Brazil ($1.3 million) and in Indonesia ($480,000), all behind Harry Potter and the Deathly Hallows – Part 2 and the third biggest in the United Kingdom ($5.4 million), behind Part 1 and Part 2. It also scored the second-biggest Warner Bros. opening of all time in the Czech Republic and Slovakia. Notably, France opened with $1.8 million, Spain with $1.4 million, and Germany with $1 million ($2 million including paid previews). In terms of opening weekends, the film posted the biggest opening among the Harry Potter franchise in 16 markets, including South Korea ($14.2 million, also the third-biggest opening for the studio), Russia ($9.8 million) and Brazil ($6.4 million), the biggest opener of the year in Germany ($10.2 million), Sweden, Belgium and Switzerland and the biggest Warner Bros. debut in those along with France ($10.2 million), the Netherlands and Denmark. Italy debuted with $6.6 million, the biggest for a U.S. film in the country. Australia opened with $7.4 million, followed by Mexico ($5.8 million) and Spain ($4.5 million).

It opened in China on 25 November alongside Disney's animated Moana but did not face significant competition from it. It earned $11.2 million on its opening day from 11,600 screens, the best among the Rowlings cinematic universe. In total, it had an opening weekend of $41.1 million, dominating 60% of the top five films with 70,000 screenings per day. This alone surpassed the entire lifetime total of all Harry Potter films save the last one. Similarly in Japan—typically the biggest or second biggest market for the previous Harry Potter films—it debuted with $15.5 million, besting the total lifetime of all the previous films except for Harry Potter and the Half-Blood Prince and Deathly Hallows – Part 2.

The film also set a number of IMAX records. In total, the opening weekend was worth $7 million from 276 screens, which is the second-highest ever in the Wizarding World, behind Deathly Hallows – Part 2. In 33 territories, it opened at number one, and was also the third-highest-grossing November international IMAX opening ever, and the No. 1 start for IMAX in November in 19 countries including Japan ($1.1 million), the UK, Russia, Germany, and the Netherlands. In China, it had the biggest IMAX opening among the franchise with $5.1 million from 347 IMAX screens. Overall, the film has earned a global cumulative total of $19.1 million from the format.

It has become the highest-grossing film in Rowling's cinematic universe in Russia ($16.7 million) and the second-highest in South Korea ($24.6 million). China ($41.1 million) the United Kingdom ($37.6 million), followed by Germany ($18.4 million), France ($16.7 million), and Spain ($13.3 million) are the film's biggest-earning markets.

Critical response 

The website's critical consensus reads, "Fantastic Beasts and Where to Find Them draws on Harry Potters rich mythology to deliver a spin-off that dazzles with franchise-building magic all its own." On Metacritic, the film has a weighted average score 66 out of 100, based on reviews from 50 critics, indicating "generally favorable reviews". Audiences polled by CinemaScore gave the film an average grade of "A" on an A+ to F scale, while PostTrak reported filmgoers gave it a 90% positive score and a 74% "definite recommend".

Peter Bradshaw of The Guardian gave the film five out of five stars, hailing it as "a rich, baroque, intricately detailed entertainment" and a "terrifically good-natured, unpretentious and irresistibly buoyant film". NMEs Larry Bartleet also gave it five out of five, calling it "more enchanting to your inner kid than the Potter films ever were". Robbie Collin of The Telegraph called the film a "spectacular feat of world-building" and said "The film is immaculately cast, and the chemistry between its four heroes holds your eye with its firework fizz." IndieWire's Eric Kohn gave the film a B+ saying that it "delivers the most satisfying period fantasy since Tim Burton's Sweeney Todd: The Demon Barber of Fleet Street", and that its layers of sophistication made it one of the best Hollywood blockbusters of the year. Peter Travers of Rolling Stone gave the film 3 out of 4 and expressed surprise at the analogies underlying the film, calling it "the first anti-Trump blockbuster". He calls Rowling "a champion of outsiders facing intolerance, segregation and demonization" and that although the film gets bogged down in exposition, the unexpectedly moving subtext carries the day. Travers concludes "The real stars here are the beasts, supposedly ugly, weird and dangerous, but paragons of FX creativity in service of genuine ideas."

Mike Ryan of Uproxx gave the film a positive review, writing "Newt Scamander is nothing like Harry, but it has to be this way. It all has to be different. And it is, but, again, with just enough 'sameness' to make us feel like we are at home again. I'm looking forward to wherever these movies are taking us". John DeFore of The Hollywood Reporter wrote that the film is "likely to draw in just about everyone who followed the Potter series and to please most of them".
In a mixed review, Ignatiy Vishnevetsky of The A.V. Club found the film "patchy but occasionally charming." David Edelstein of New York Magazine called it a "distinctly unmagical slog", remarking that the beasts "aren't especially fantastic and the effects are too blandly corporate to be exhilarating".

Accolades 

The film was nominated for two Academy Awards and won for Best Costume Design, becoming the first Wizarding World film to win an Academy Award. It was also nominated for five British Academy Film Awards, including Best British Film, and won for Best Production Design.

Sequels 

Initially, in October 2014, the studio announced the film would be the start of a trilogy. In July 2016, David Yates confirmed that Rowling had written the screenplay for the second film and had ideas for the third. In October 2016, Rowling announced that the series would comprise five films.

The first sequel, titled Fantastic Beasts: The Crimes of Grindelwald, was released on 16 November 2018. The second sequel, Fantastic Beasts: The Secrets of Dumbledore, was released in the United Kingdom on 8 April 2022 and in the United States on 15 April 2022; production was delayed due to the COVID-19 pandemic.

References

Literature

External links 

 
 
 
 

2016 films
2016 3D films
2010s fantasy adventure films
2010s monster movies
American 3D films
American fantasy adventure films
BAFTA winners (films)
British 3D films
British fantasy adventure films
Dune Entertainment films
2010s English-language films
Films based on works by J. K. Rowling
Films scored by James Newton Howard
Film spin-offs
Films directed by David Yates
Films produced by David Heyman
Films produced by Steve Kloves
Films produced by J. K. Rowling
Films set in 1926
Films set in London
British films set in New York City
Films set in the Roaring Twenties
Films shot in Hertfordshire
Films shot in London
Films shot at Warner Bros. Studios, Leavesden
Films that won the Best Costume Design Academy Award
Heyday Films films
Prequel films
IMAX films
Fiction about memory erasure and alteration
Matricide in fiction
Warner Bros. films
Fantastic Beasts films
Films with screenplays by J. K. Rowling
Films shot in Bedfordshire
2010s American films
2010s British films
American prequel films
British prequel films